Sārasvati Bhavana Granthamala (previously known as Sarasvati Bhavana Texts) is a series of editions of Sanskrit scholarly texts. The publication of the series began in 1920, on behalf of Sarasvati Bhawan, the Library, Government Sanskrit College, Varanasi as The Princess of Wales Sārasvati Bhavana Texts. This project of publication was accepted by the attempt of Sir Buller, who was the education director of the United Provinces, under British rule, in India.

Aim 
Sārasvati Bhavan library is the richest of Sanskrit manuscripts in India. Dr. Ganganath Jha suggested and recommended the publication of rare manuscripts collected in this library.  These manuscripts were written on palm leaves, clothes, birch, wooden plates and old paper.  It was necessary to unearth this treasure of knowledge of scholars.

Subjects 
These manuscripts were written on different subjects of Sanskrit, such as 
1. Vedas
2. Nyāya
3. Mimāṃsā
4. Vyākaraṇa
5. Literature
6. Drama
7. Astrology
8. Dharmaśāstra
9. Puranas
etc.

History 
Sārasvati Bhavan Texts published since 1920 from Government Sanskrit College, Benares.  In 1958 this college merged in Sampurnanand Sanskrit University.  This University established a Research Institute for editing, publication of manuscript and comparative & critical researches.

The director of Research Institute was editor of all publications and research activities done in the University.
After independence 'Princess of Wales' was removed from Sārasvati Bhavana Texts and its renamed to "Sārasvati Bhavana Granthamala".  In this series more than 150 books are published.

Editors of Sārasvati Bhavana Granthamala

Gopinath Kaviraj principal of the college, 1923 to 1937, also remained editor of the series. He received the Padma Vibhushan in 1964. From 1991 this Granthamala was forwarded by the Vice-Chancellors of the University, under the supervision of director, Research Institute.

References

Bibliography

External links 
 Princess of Wales Sarasvati Bhavana Texts (Vidya Vilas Press) - Book Series List - List of first 55 books in the series.
 Sarasvati Bhavan Library, Sampurnananda Sanskrit University, Varanasi, asj.ioc.u-tokyo.ac.jp (archive copy).

Sanskrit texts
Education in Varanasi
Libraries in Uttar Pradesh
Series of books